Bruno Miguel Miranda Bolas (born 24 June 1996) is a Portuguese professional footballer who plays for S.C. Covilhã as a goalkeeper

Club career
He made his LigaPro debut for Sporting Covilhã on 5 May 2019 in a game against Leixões.

References

External links

1996 births
Living people
Portuguese footballers
Association football goalkeepers
Liga Portugal 2 players
Segunda Divisão players
S.C. Vila Real players
AD Oliveirense players
R.D. Águeda players
S.C. Covilhã players
Sportspeople from Portalegre District